Felton Head is a flat-topped, dark brown headland with a sheer seaward side, standing  east of Harrop Island on the coast of Enderby Land, Antarctica. It was plotted from air photos taken by the Australian National Antarctic Research Expeditions in 1956, and was named for Sergeant Kevin Felton, Royal Australian Air Force, an engine fitter at Mawson Station in 1960.

References 

Headlands of Enderby Land